Craig Davies may refer to:

Craig Davies (footballer) (born 1986), Wales international football player
Craig Davies (special effects artist), movie model maker, art designer and visual effects director
Craig Davies (musician), English singer/songwriter
Craig Davies (field hockey) (born 1967), Australian field hockey player
Craig Davies (racing driver) (born 1960), entrepreneur and race car driver

See also
Craig Davis (disambiguation)